Anil Kapoor (born 24 December 1956) is an Indian actor and film producer who has appeared in many Bollywood films and more recently international films. Kapoor's career has spanned for over 30 years as an actor, he turned into producer with his critically acclaimed film Gandhi, My Father (2007). His first role as a lead actor was in the Tollywood Telugu film Vamsa Vruksham (1980). He won his first Filmfare Award for Best Supporting Actor category, for his role in Yash Chopra's Mashaal (1984). Kapoor earned his first Filmfare Award for Best Actor for his performance in N. Chandra's Tezaab (1988) and later again for his performance in Indra Kumar's Beta (1992). He also starred in many other critically and commercially successful films, including Woh Saat Din (1983), Meri Jung (1985), Janbaaz (1986), Karma (1986), Mr. India (1987), Lamhe (1991), Virasat (1997) for which he won the Filmfare Award for Best Actor (Critics), Biwi No.1 (1999), Taal (1999) for which he won his second Filmfare Award for Best Supporting Actor, Pukar (2000) for which he won a National Film Award for Best Actor as well as No Entry (2005), Welcome (2007), Race (2008) and Race 2 (2013). He also received another Filmfare Award for Best Supporting Actor for Dil Dhadakne Do (2015).

National and International

National Film Awards

Filmfare Awards

IIFA Awards

Screen Awards

Zee Cine Awards

Bollywood Movie Awards

Sansui Awards

Screen Actors Guild Awards

Stardust Awards

Times of India Film Awards

Other Awards

Honours

See also
 List of accolades received by Dil Dhadakne Do
List of accolades received by Slumdog Millionaire

References

Lists of awards received by Indian actor
Awards